Campus Field is a 3,334-seat multi-purpose stadium in Fairfield, Connecticut. It is home to the Sacred Heart University Pioneers football, lacrosse, and track and field teams. The facility opened in 1993.

The field and track located at Campus Field were modernized and renovated in the summer of 2008. The field was returfed in 2009 and 2014. 

In 2022, the Notre Dame Catholic High School football team played their home games on the field.

See also
 List of NCAA Division I FCS football stadiums

References

External links
Campus Field - Sacred Heart Pioneers

Sports venues completed in 1993
Sacred Heart Pioneers football
Buildings and structures in Fairfield, Connecticut
College football venues
American football venues in Connecticut
Multi-purpose stadiums in the United States
Sports venues in Fairfield County, Connecticut
1993 establishments in Connecticut
Soccer venues in Connecticut
Lacrosse venues in Connecticut